The Flag Officer Submarines (FOSM) is the single-point class authority of submarines in the Indian Navy. A two star Officer holding the rank of Rear Admiral, the FOSM is responsible for submarine safety, submarine training, maintenance and operating schedules and operational readiness inspections. The current FOSM is Rear Admiral A. Y. Sardesai who assumed office on 5 February 2020.

History

The submarine base INS Virbahu in Visakhapatnam was commissioned on 19 May 1971 as the shore support base for submarines. The Commanding Officer of Virbahu functioned as the Captain of the submarine squadron and the class Authority for all submarines.

In 1985, the Navy's Command and Control structure was streamlined. To rationalise Command and Control of the Submarine Arm, a single-point class authority was constituted which would be located at the Submarine Headquarters in Visakhapatnam. This authority would be responsible for all training and maintenance of submarines, analogous to Flag Officer Naval Aviation (FONA). The authority was christened Flag Officer Submarines (FOSM) and Rear Admiral Arun Auditto,  took over as the first FOSM. The FOSM was to be responsible to NHQ for all Class Authority and training functions in regard to submarines. The FOSM would be under the administrative control of the Flag Officer Commanding-in-Chief Eastern Naval Command. (FOC-in-C ENC), but interact with the FOC-in-C of both Eastern Naval Command and Western Naval Command on all matters related to his charter of duties.

In the 1990s, the need for a senior officer at Naval headquarters was felt. The officer would impart senior level advice on submarine matters. On 14 October 1996, the appointment of Assistant Chief of Naval Staff (Submarines) (ACNS SM) was created. Rear Admiral Arun Kumar Singh,  took over as the first ACNS (SM). He also dual-hatted as the FOSM. While the policy decisions were taken by the FOSM, the administration of the submarine HQ was carried out by a Commodore. The ACNS functioned under the Deputy Chief of the Naval Staff. In January 2001, the post of ACNS (SM) was instituted as a separate billet. The ACNS (SM) is based at NHQ while the FOSM is based at Visakhapatnam.

Structure
The submarine base INS Virbahu and the submarine training school INS Satavahana come under the FOSM. INS Satavahana, being a training establishment comes under the Flag Officer Commanding-in-Chief Southern Naval Command since the command is the training command of the Navy. FOSM provides necessary support to FOC-in-C South for technical aspects of submarine training.

List of FOSM

See also
 Commodore Commanding Submarines (East)
 Commodore Commanding Submarines (West)

Notes

References

Bibliography

Indian Navy
Indian military appointments
Indian Navy appointments